Ander Barinaga-Rementeria Arano (born August 13, 1992, Bilbao, Spain) is a Spanish film, theater and television actor and film producer.

Life and career 

He studied, trained and graduated in theatre, drama and acting (BA) in Ánima Eskola School of Drama with David Valdelvira, Marina Shimanskaya and Algis Arlauskas, training as a method actor, under the Stanislavsky-M.Chekhov-Grotowski-Vakhtangov methodology (Russian method), following the methodologies of the Russian classical school.

He got a bachelor's degree in audiovisual communication at the University of the Basque Country (UPV/EHU), specializing in multimedia production and realization. She later studied a master's degree in film industry management at the Carlos III University of Madrid.

Since 2010, he has worked in more than a dozen theatrical productions and differente television series and films. He was a member of the theater group Eufrasia: Capital Teatral. She first came to prominence on the EITB Media television series Goenkale playing Jokin Odriozola (2010–2013).

In 2008 he received the Buero Vallejo Award for the best actor in a theatrical/stage production, for the play Vivir será primero/Live will be first, directed by Txema Pérez and Alicia Gómez.

He is also a film producer. He has worked as a film production teacher at different schools, including the Basque Country Film School.

Filmography

Television 

 2010–2013, Goenkale, ETB 1 (as Jokin Odriozola)

Film 

 2022, Ilargi guztiak
 2021, Harria eta Bidea
 2019, Padre no hay más que uno, dir. Santiago Segura
 2019, ¿Qué te juegas?, dir. Inés de León
 2018, Ola de crímenes, dir. Gracia Querejeta
 2018, Oreina/Ciervo, dir. Koldo Almandoz
 2016, Rendezvous, dir. Guillermo Julián and Román Santiago Pidre
 2015, Txarriboda, dir. Javier Rebollo and Alvar Gordejuela.
 2013, Gosea, dir. Itziar Cantero
 2012, Ateak

Stage 

 2011, The Cherry Orchard, by Anton Chekhov, dir. Marina Shimanskaya, stage production at the Campos Elíseos Theatre
 2010, A Straw Hat from Italy, by Eugene Labiche, stage production at the Campos Elíseos Theatre
 2010, Trees Die Standing, by Alejandro Casona, stage production at the Campos Elíseos Theatre
 2010, M'hijo el dotor, by Florencio Sánchez, stage production at the Campos Elíseos Theatre
 2009, Nobody pays here!, by Dario Fo
 2008, Live will be first, dir. Txema Perez and Alicia Gomez
 2007, Neither more nor less

Awards and nominations

Buero Vallejo Awards

References

External links 

 

1992 births
Living people
People from Bilbao
Ánima Eskola School of Drama alumni
21st-century Spanish actors
Spanish film actors
Spanish television actors
Spanish stage actors